Ravi Kale is an Indian actor known for his works in Kannada, Tamil, Hindi, Telugu and Marathi films.

Filmography

Marathi
Bangarwadi (1995)
Sumbaran (2009)
Pipani (2012)
Vanilla,Strawberry & Chocolate (2018)

Hindi
Ek Hasina Thi (2004)
Ab Tak Chhappan (2004)
James (2005)
Sarkar (2005)
Teesri Aankh: The Hidden Camera (2006)
Black Friday (2007)
Aag (2007)
Go (2007)
Sarkar Raj (2008)
Agyaat (2009)
The Attacks of 26/11 (2013)
Baadshaho (2017)
Haathi Mere Saathi (2021)

Kannada
Cyanide (2006)
Vamshi (2008)
Mylari (2010)
Jackie (2010)
Deadly-2 (2010)
Dashamukha (2012)
Khatarnak (2013)
Attahasa (2013)
Lakshmi (2013)
Dandupalya (2013)
Ambareesha (2014)
Vajrakaya (2015)
Mythri (2015)
Ram-Leela (2015)
Ricky (2016)
Home Stay (2016)
Happy Birthday (2016)
Jaguar (2016)
March 22 (2016)
Pushpaka Vimana (2017)
Hebbuli  (2017)
Naa Panta Kano (2017)
Dandupalya 2 (2017)
Amma I Love You (2018)
Jhansi I.P.S (2020)

Tamil
Saravana (2006)
Kreedam (2007)
Sathyam (2008)
Thenavattu (2008)
Aattanayagann (2010)
Ayyanar (2010)
Guru Sishyan (2010)
Eppadi Manasukkul Vanthai (2012)
Dhigil (2016)
Kaala (2018)
Kaadan (2021)
 Pattathu Arasan (2022)

Telugu
Mass (2004)
Shock (2006)
Ashok (2006)
Asadhyudu (2006)
Okka Magaadu (2008)
Salute (2008)
Drushyam (2014)
Jadoogadu (2015)
Krishna Gaadi Veera Prema Gaadha (2016)
Rendu Rendlu Aaru (2017)
Naa Peru Surya (2018)
Padi Padi Leche Manasu (2018)
Software Sudheer (2019)
Aranya (2021)

References

Indian male film actors
1973 births
Living people
Male actors in Hindi cinema
Male actors in Telugu cinema
21st-century Indian male actors
Male actors from Maharashtra
Male actors in Marathi cinema
Male actors in Kannada cinema
Male actors in Tamil cinema